Nathaniel T. Oaks (born October 19, 1946) is an American politician from Baltimore City, Maryland. He was a longtime member of the Maryland General Assembly, serving as a member of the Maryland House of Delegates from 1983 to 1989 and again from 1995 to February 2017, when he resigned to take a seat in the Maryland State Senate. Oaks remained in the state Senate until March 29, 2018, when he resigned from office on the same day he pleaded guilty to federal corruption charges.

Background
Born in Baltimore, Maryland, Oaks attended Edmondson High School, the University of Baltimore, Towson State College and graduated from Morgan State University with a Bachelor of Science in business in 1974.

Maryland legislature

First arrest
Oaks was a member of the House of Delegates from 1983 to 1989 when he automatically forfeited his seat after being convicted of theft charges for $10,000 for double-billing expenses to the State in his official capacity and to his campaign fund.

After a losing bid to regain office in 1990, Oaks was re-elected in 1994 when several incumbent delegates retired.

Legislative notes
Co-sponsored HB 860 (Baltimore City Public Schools Construction and Revitalization Act of 2013). Signed by the Governor on May 16, 2013, the new law approved 1.1 billion dollars to construct new schools in Baltimore City.

Election results
2006 Primary Race for Maryland House of Delegates – District 41
Voters to choose three:
{| class="wikitable"
!Name
!Votes
!Percent
!Outcome
|-
|-
|Jill P. Carter, Dem.
|13,196
|  31.2%
|   Won
|-
|-
|Samuel I. Rosenberg, Dem.
|9,215
|  21.8%
|   Won
|-
|-
|Nathaniel T. Oaks, Dem.
|9,189
|  21.7%
|   Won
|-
|-
|Wendall Phillips
|6,480
|  15.3%
|   Lost
|-
|-
|Kevin Hargrave
|2,095
|  5.0%
|   Lost
|-
|-
|Karen M. Ferguson 
|2,116
|  5.0%
|   Lost
|}

Appointed senator
Governor Larry Hogan appointed Oaks to the Maryland State Senate in 2017 when Lisa Gladden retired due to illness.

Second arrest and resignation
In May 2017, State Senator Oaks was indicted in U.S. District Court on nine counts of wire fraud, fraud, and bribery in connection with an influence-peddling scheme. In November 2017, Oaks was additionally charged with obstruction of justice, relating to "an allegation that Oaks sabotaged another investigation by tipping off the target."

On March 29, 2018, Oaks resigned his state Senate seat, and hours later pleaded guilty to two wire fraud charges and admitted that he had made "corrupt use of his office in a bribery scheme." The remaining charges against him were dismissed.

Although federal prosecutors asked for a 5 year prison sentence, on July 17, 2018, Oaks was formally sentenced to three and a half years in prison. U.S. District Judge Richard Bennett found Oaks guilty on one count of wire fraud and one count of honest services wire fraud after he signed a plea agreement early 2018 confirming he had accepted a bribe from a disguised FBI informant and agreed to help defraud a federal housing agency. Oaks was ordered to pay a $30,000 fine and perform 80 hours of community service. It was reported in June 2020 that Oaks was granted compassionate release from prison due to poor health amid the COVID-19 pandemic after serving about half of his sentence.

References

1946 births
Living people
20th-century African-American people
21st-century African-American politicians
21st-century American politicians
African-American state legislators in Maryland
Maryland politicians convicted of crimes
Democratic Party Maryland state senators
Democratic Party members of the Maryland House of Delegates
Morgan State University alumni
Politicians convicted of mail and wire fraud
Politicians from Baltimore
Towson University alumni